Morgan v. U.S. is the name of a number of noted Supreme Court cases:

 Morgan v. United States (1871) (81 U.S. 531)
 Morgan v. United States (1885) (113 U.S. 476), a case involving several judgments of the United States Court of Claims in four cases against the United States for the payment of United States bonds known as "five-twenty bonds"
 Morgan v. United States (1936) (298 U.S. 468)
 Morgan v. United States (1938) (304 U.S. 1)

See also 
 United States v. Morgan (disambiguation)